Georg Gottlob FRS is an Austrian computer scientist who works in the areas of database theory, logic, and artificial intelligence and is Professor of Informatics at the University of Oxford.

Education
Gottlob obtained his undergraduate and PhD degrees in computer science at Vienna University of Technology in 1981.

Career and research
Gottlob is currently a chaired professor of computing science at the Oxford University Department of Computer Science, where he helped establish the information systems research group. He is also a Fellow of St John's College, Oxford. Previously, he was a professor of computer science at Vienna University of Technology, where he still maintains an adjunct position. He was elected a member of the Royal Society in May 2010. He is a founding member of the Oxford-Man Institute.

He has published more than 250 scientific articles in the areas of computational logic, database theory, and artificial intelligence, and one textbook on logic programming and databases.

In the area of artificial intelligence, he is best known for his influential early work on the complexity of nonmonotonic logics and on (generalised) hypertree decompositions, a framework for obtaining tractable structural classes of constraint satisfaction problems, and a generalisation of the notion of tree decomposition from graph theory. This work has also had substantial impact in database theory, since it is known that the problem of evaluating conjunctive queries on relational databases is equivalent to the constraint satisfaction problem. His recent work on XML query languages (notably XPath) has helped create the complexity-theoretical foundations of this area.

Awards and honours
Gottlob has received numerous awards and honours including election to the Royal Society in 2010.  His nomination for the Royal Society reads: 

Gottlob has also been designated as an ECCAI fellow  in 2002, and received honorary doctorates from the University of Klagenfurt (2016) and the University of Vienna (2020).

References

Austrian computer scientists
Fellows of the Association for Computing Machinery
Fellows of the Royal Society
Database researchers
Living people
Royal Society Wolfson Research Merit Award holders
Members of the Department of Computer Science, University of Oxford
Members of Academia Europaea
1956 births
Scientists from Vienna
TU Wien alumni
Fellows of St Anne's College, Oxford
Fellows of St John's College, Oxford
Academic staff of TU Wien